Modeste Bahati Lukwebo is an economist, businessperson and politician in the Democratic Republic of the Congo. He is president of the Alliance des Forces Démocratiques du Congo (AFDC). In 2021 he became President of the Senate.

Life
Modeste Bahati Lukwebo is from South Kivu.

Modeste Bahati Lukwebo established the ADFC in 2010. He was Minister of Employment, Labor and Social Welfare under president Joseph Kabila, with the ADFC forming a second plank of Kabila's Common Front for Congo.

However, in 2019 Bahati Lukwebo left Kabila's camp and moved closer to Félix Tshisekedi's Union for Democracy and Social Progress. After participating in the breakup between Kabila and Tshisekedi, he was one of the architects of the 'Sacred Union of the Nation'. On 31 December 2020 President Tshisekedi chose him to help form a new parliamentary majority. As negotiations proceeded for a 'Sacred Union' government, Bahati Lukwebo was on Tshisekedi's shortlist for the position of prime minister, though this went to Sama Lukonde Kyenge in February. On 2 March 2021 Bahati Lukwebo was elected president of the Senate, replacing Kabila's supporter Alexis Thambwe Mwamba.

References

Year of birth missing (living people)
Living people
Presidents of the Senate (Democratic Republic of the Congo)
Democratic Republic of the Congo businesspeople
Democratic Republic of the Congo economists